Chondrodactylus is  genus of geckos, lizards in the family Gekkonidae. The genus is commonly known as thick-toed geckos. Little is known of their biology.

Species and subspecies
The following species and subspecies are recognized as being valid.
Chondrodactylus angulifer  – common giant ground gecko
Chondrodactylus angulifer angulifer 
Chondrodactylus angulifer namibensis 
Chondrodactylus bibronii  – Bibron's thick-toed gecko 
Chondrodactylus fitzsimonsi  – Fitzsimons's thick-toed gecko
Chondrodactylus laevigatus  – Fischer's thick-toed gecko 
Chondrodactylus pulitzerae  – Pulitzer's thick-toed gecko
Chondrodactylus turneri  – Turner's thick-toed gecko

Nota bene: A binomial authority in parentheses indicates that the species was originally described in a genus other than Chondrodactylus.

References

External links

 
Lizard genera
Taxa named by Wilhelm Peters